= Casa del Cabildo (Cartagena, Colombia) =

Historic building in Colombia

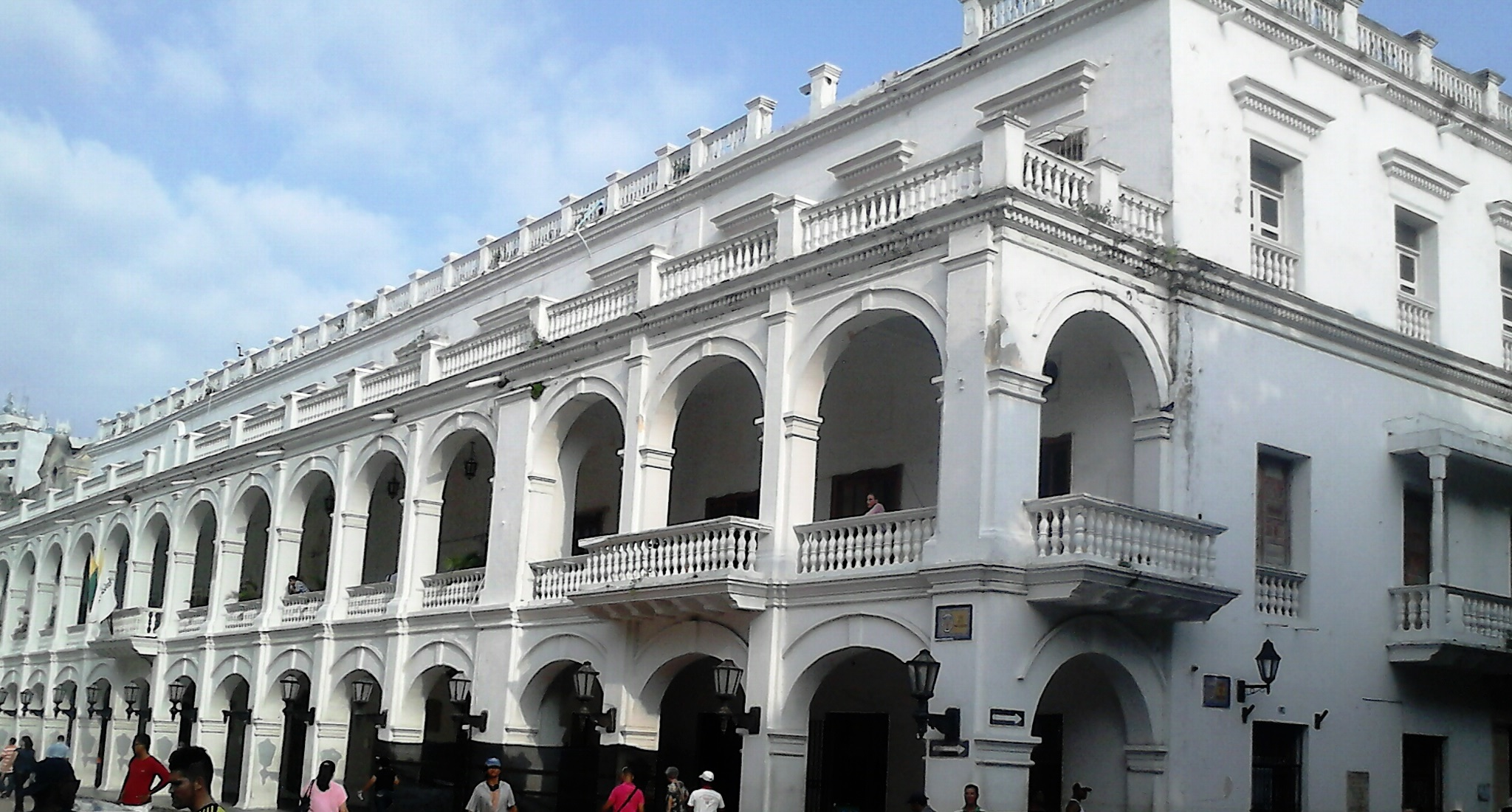
Casa del Cabildo of Cartagena

The Casa del Cabildo, also called the Palacio de la Gobernación, is the seat of the Government of the Bolívar Department. It is located in Cartagena, Colombia.

Before this building there was a primitive town hall, which was poorer in terms of its construction. It also was a space for the building's prison.

In 1614, a formal request was made for a new building to house the city council and city jail. For this purpose, this current building was built in 1676.

This building is based on the town halls of the old Kingdom of Castile in Spain that stand out for two galleries open to the square.

Throughout its history, this town hall has received many important visitors, and inside the building the Cartagena Independence Act was signed.

== Gallery ==
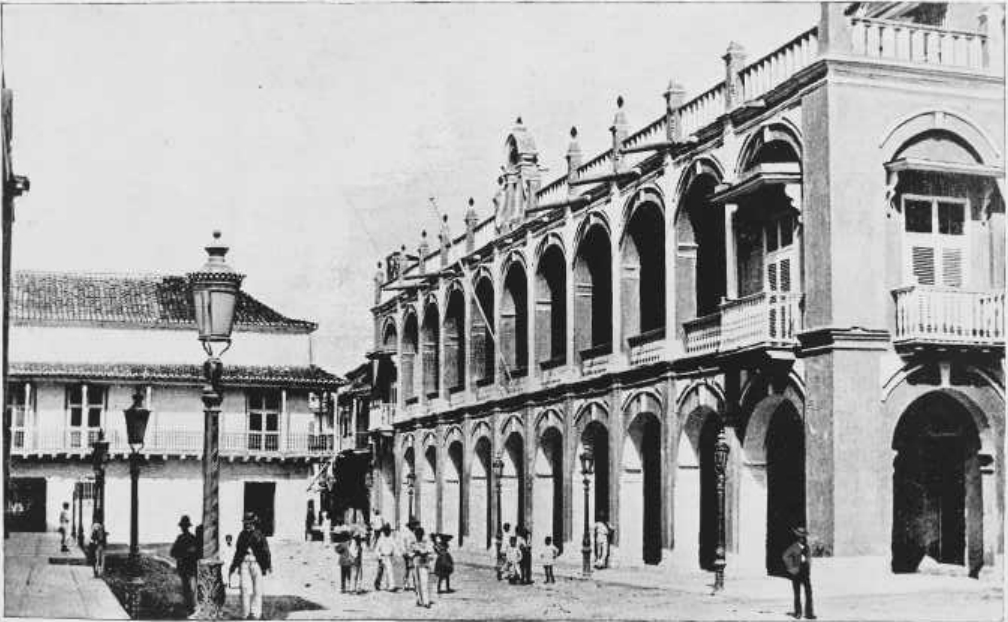
Cabildo of Cartagena in 1893

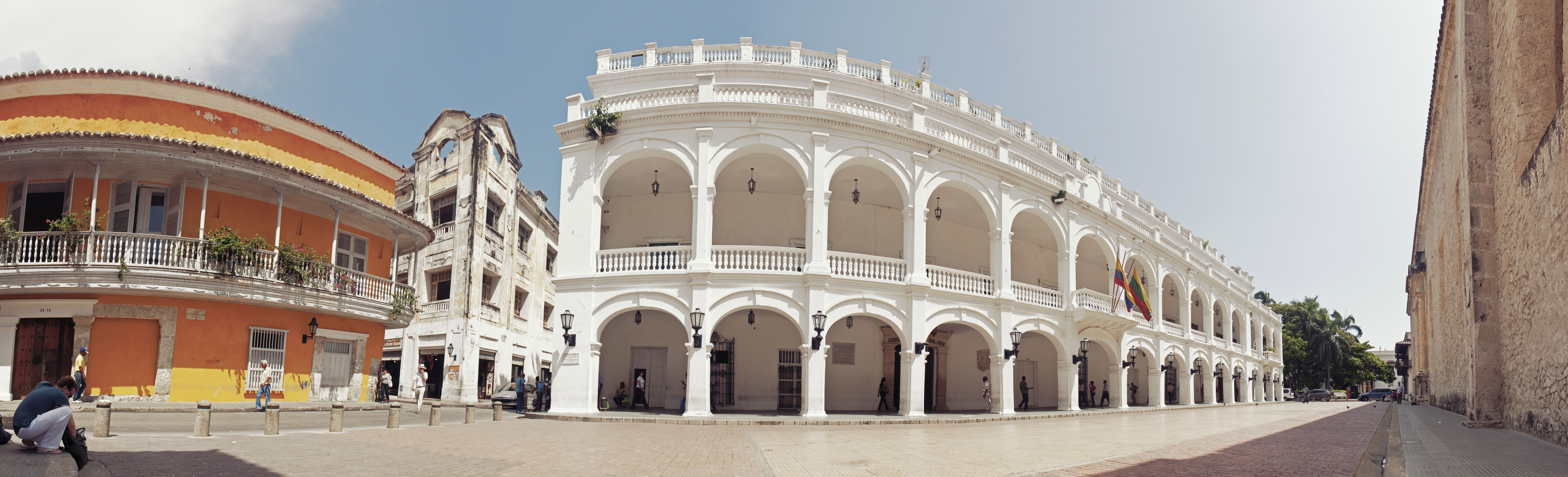
Panoramic view

== See also ==
- List of colonial buildings in Cartagena, Colombia
